Anilite (IMA symbol: Ani) is a mineral with the chemical formula CuS. It is named for its type locality, the Ani Mine in Akita Prefecture.

References

External links 

 Anilite data sheet
 Anilite on the Handbook of Geology

Copper(I,II) minerals
Sulfur(−II) compounds